Nadia is a 1984 made-for-television biopic directed by Alan Cooke about Olympic gymnast Nadia Comăneci. Comăneci herself had nothing to do with the production of the film (the content of which was described to her by others). She stated at the time of its release that those involved with the film never made contact with her: "I sincerely don't even want to see it, I feel so badly about it. It distorts my life so totally."

Plot
As a young child, Romanian Nadia Comăneci was discovered by domineering gymnastics coach Béla Károlyi. Károlyi and his wife Márta trained Comăneci in their gymnastics school for eight years. Comăneci eventually became a world champion gymnast. In 1976, at the age of 14, she became the first woman to ever score a perfect 10 at the Olympics; she ended the competition with seven 10s, three gold medals, one silver, and one bronze and became an instant celebrity in Romania and around the world. However, the pressure was too much for Comăneci to handle. She was separated from the Károlyis by the Romanian government and became overweight and out-of-shape. She eventually rebounded, though, and led her country to the 1979 World Championship gold.

Cast
 Leslie Weiner as Young Nadia Comăneci
 Johann Carlo as Older Nadia Comăneci
 Joe Bennett as Béla Károlyi
 Talia Balsam as Márta Károlyi
 Conchata Ferrell as Mili Simonescu
 Carl Strano as Nicholae Vieru
 Jonathan Banks as Gheorge Comăneci
 Carrie Snodgress as Stefania Comăneci
 Lyudmila Turischeva as Young Teodora Ungureanu
 Sara Chana Silverstein as Older Teodora Ungureanu
 Marcia Frederick as Nadia Comăneci (stunts)

Notes

External links

1984 films
1980s biographical films
1984 drama films
Films about women's sports
Gymnastics films
Sports films based on actual events
Films about Olympic gymnastics
Films about the 1976 Summer Olympics
Biographical films about sportspeople
Cultural depictions of Romanian women
Cultural depictions of gymnasts
Films set in Romania
Films set in the 1970s
Films set in 1976
Films set in 1979
Films shot in Yugoslavia
Films produced by Tribune Entertainment
1980s English-language films